Weston County is a county in the U.S. state of Wyoming. As of the 2020 United States Census, the population was 6,838. Its county seat is Newcastle. Its east boundary line abuts the west line of the state of South Dakota.

History
Weston County was created by the legislature of the Wyoming Territory on March 12, 1890, of land partitioned from Crook County.

Weston County was named for John Weston, a geologist and surveyor. In 1887, Jefferson Weston and Frank Mondell found rich coal deposits north of Newcastle which caused a railroad to be built through the area.

In 1911, Campbell County was formed from portions of Weston County and Crook County. Since then, the boundaries of Weston County have been stable.

Geography

Adjacent counties

Crook County – north
Lawrence County, South Dakota – northeast
Pennington County, South Dakota – east
Custer County, South Dakota – southeast
Niobrara County – south
Converse County – southwest
Campbell County – west

Major highways

 U.S. Highway 16
 U.S. Highway 20
 U.S. Highway 85
 Wyoming Highway 116
 Wyoming Highway 450
 Wyoming Highway 585

National protected areas
Black Hills National Forest (part)
Thunder Basin National Grassland (part)

Demographics

2000 census
As of the 2000 United States Census, there were 6,644 people, 2,624 households, and 1,868 families in the county. The population density was 3 people per square mile (1/km2). There were 3,231 housing units at an average density of 1.3 per square mile (0.5/km2). The racial makeup of the county was 95.94% White, 0.12% Black or African American, 1.26% Native American, 0.20% Asian, 0.02% Pacific Islander, 0.93% from other races, and 1.54% from two or more races. 2.06% of the population were Hispanic or Latino of any race. 33.0% were of German, 13.0% English, 8.9% Irish and 7.2% American ancestry.

There were 2,624 households, out of which 31.10% had children under the age of 18 living with them, 60.40% were married couples living together, 7.30% had a female householder with no husband present, and 28.80% were non-families. 25.00% of all households were made up of individuals, and 11.50% had someone living alone who was 65 years of age or older. The average household size was 2.42 and the average family size was 2.88.

The county population contained 24.10% under the age of 18, 7.40% from 18 to 24, 26.30% from 25 to 44, 26.70% from 45 to 64, and 15.60% who were 65 years of age or older. The median age was 41 years. For every 100 females there were 103.10 males. For every 100 females age 18 and over, there were 103.80 males.

The median income for a household in the county was $32,348, and the median income for a family was $40,472. Males had a median income of $34,321 versus $18,640 for females. The per capita income for the county was $17,366. About 6.30% of families and 9.90% of the population were below the poverty line, including 11.30% of those under age 18 and 13.60% of those age 65 or over.

2010 census
As of the 2010 United States Census, there were 7,208 people, 3,021 households, and 1,957 families in the county. The racial makeup of the county was 95.5% white, 1.3% American Indian, 0.3% black or African American, 0.3% Asian, 0.9% from other races, and 1.7% from two or more races. Those of Hispanic or Latino origin made up 3.0% of the population. In terms of ancestry, 31.7% were German, 19.3% were Irish, 18.5% were English, 6.6% were Norwegian, 6.1% were Swedish, and 5.6% were American.

Of the 3,021 households, 26.1% had children under the age of 18 living with them, 53.2% were married couples living together, 6.9% had a female householder with no husband present, 35.2% were non-families, and 29.9% of all households were made up of individuals. The average household size was 2.28 and the average family size was 2.81. The median age was 42.3 years.

The median income for a household in the county was $53,853 and the median income for a family was $63,438. Males had a median income of $53,095 versus $28,724 for females. The per capita income for the county was $28,463. About 5.8% of families and 7.9% of the population were below the poverty line, including 10.1% of those under age 18 and 10.1% of those age 65 or over.

Communities

City
 Newcastle (county seat)

Town
 Upton

Census-designated places
 Hill View Heights
 Osage

Other places
 Buchorn
 Clareton
 Four Corners

Politics
Like all of the High Plains, and almost all of Wyoming, Weston County is overwhelmingly Republican. Since Wyoming statehood in 1890, it has been carried by a Democrat just three times. Woodrow Wilson carried the county in 1912 as a result of a split between the conservative incumbent William Howard Taft and Progressive ex-President Theodore Roosevelt, whilst in his two 1930s landslides Franklin D. Roosevelt became the other Democrat to win Weston County, although he defeated Republican Alf Landon in 1936 by just 109 votes.

Subsequent to Lyndon Johnson losing the county to Barry Goldwater by just fifty-four votes in 1964, no Democrat has passed 35 percent of Weston County's vote. Indeed, Bill Clinton in 1996 was the last to pass twenty percent for the Democratic Party, and his wife Hillary lost Weston – and most High Plains counties – by worse than a ten-to-one margin in 2016 against Donald Trump.

The Wyoming Department of Corrections Wyoming Honor Conservation Camp & Boot Camp is located in Newcastle. The facility was operated by the Wyoming Board of Charities and Reform until that agency was dissolved as a result of a state constitutional amendment passed in November 1990.

See also

National Register of Historic Places listings in Weston County, Wyoming
Wyoming
List of cities and towns in Wyoming
List of counties in Wyoming
Wyoming statistical areas

References

External links

History of Weston County

 
1890 establishments in Wyoming
Populated places established in 1890
Black Hills